Assi Guma is an Israeli footballer who plays for Tzeirei Tayibe at Liga Alef.

References

External links
 

1989 births
Living people
Israeli footballers
Hapoel Hadera F.C. players
F.C. Givat Olga players
Hapoel Asi Gilboa F.C. players
Hapoel Ashkelon F.C. players
Hapoel Ramat Gan F.C. players
Ironi Tiberias F.C. players
Liga Leumit players
Israeli Premier League players
Footballers from Hadera
Association football forwards